Wladimir Belli (born 25 July 1970, in Sorengo) is an Italian former professional road bicycle racer. He was a professional between 1992 and 2007.

In the 2001 Giro d'Italia, Belli was sitting in third place overall entering the 14th stage of the race. After being verbally abused by a spectator, who later turned out to be a nephew of race leader Gilberto Simoni, Belli hit the man, an act for which he was disqualified from the race.

Major results

1990
 1st  Overall Girobio
 1st GP Capodarco
1991
 2nd Giro del Belvedere
1993
 2nd Overall Kellogg's Tour
 3rd Trofeo Melinda
 4th Overall Giro del Trentino
 8th Overall Tour de Romandie
 9th Coppa Ugo Agostoni
1994
 3rd Gran Premio Industria e Commercio di Prato
 4th Overall Volta a Catalunya
 4th Milano–Torino
 5th Giro dell'Emilia
 6th Trofeo Laigueglia
1995
 3rd Giro dell'Appennino
 8th Giro dell'Emilia
 9th Giro del Lazio
1996
 1st  Overall Giro del Trentino
 1st Giro dell'Appennino
 2nd Overall Vuelta a Murcia
 3rd Overall Tour Méditerranéen
 8th Overall Étoile de Bessèges
 8th Trofeo Laigueglia
1997
 2nd Overall Volta a Portugal
1st Stage 5 
 2nd Trofeo Melinda
 5th Milano–Torino
 6th Overall Giro d'Italia
 6th Overall Four Days of Dunkirk
 9th Giro di Lombardia
1998
 3rd Overall Tour de Suisse
 3rd Overall Volta a Portugal
1st Stage 6
 4th Gran Premio Industria e Commercio di Prato
 5th Giro dell'Emilia
 5th Coppa Placci
 6th Overall Giro del Trentino
 7th Overall Volta a la Comunitat Valenciana
 9th Coppa Sabatini
 10th Overall Tour of the Basque Country
 10th Trofeo Melinda
1999
 1st Stage 3 (ITT) Grand Prix du Midi Libre
 2nd Overall Tour of the Basque Country
 2nd Overall Volta a la Comunitat Valenciana
 3rd Overall Tour de Romandie
 3rd Overall Critérium du Dauphiné Libéré
1st  Mountains classification 
 3rd Overall Setmana Catalana de Ciclisme
 3rd Overall Tour Méditerranéen
 4th Trofeo Laigueglia
 8th Overall Paris–Nice
 9th Overall Tour de France
2000
 1st Gran Premio Città di Camaiore
 2nd Overall Settimana Internazionale di Coppi e Bartali
 3rd Overall Tour de Suisse
1st Stage 3
 4th Liège–Bastogne–Liège
 7th Overall Giro d'Italia
 7th Overall Volta a la Comunitat Valenciana
 7th Giro di Lombardia
 10th Overall Tour de Romandie
2001
 3rd Overall Tour de Suisse
 3rd Overall Tour de Romandie
 4th Clásica de San Sebastián
 6th Trofeo Melinda
 7th Gran Premio Città di Camaiore
 8th Giro di Lombardia
2002
 4th Gran Premio Città di Camaiore
 7th Overall Setmana Catalana de Ciclisme
2003
 3rd Giro della Liguria
 8th Overall Tour of the Basque Country
 8th GP Miguel Induráin
2004
 7th Overall Giro d'Italia
2006
 6th Overall Vuelta por un Chile Líder

Grand Tour general classification results timeline

References

External links 

1970 births
Living people
Italian male cyclists
Sportspeople from Ticino
Swiss people of Italian descent
Tour de Suisse stage winners